is a Japanese track and field athlete from Nagasaki Prefecture who specializes in long-distance running. He graduated from Yamanashi Gakuin University. He is a member of the Mitsubishi Hitachi Power Systems team in Nagasaki.

Personal history 
Inoue finished in eighth place in the 2017 Tokyo Marathon, the highest result among Japanese runners. He finished 5th, with his personal best, in the 2018 Tokyo Marathon.

References

External links 
 
 

1993 births
Living people
Japanese male long-distance runners
Japanese male marathon runners
Asian Games gold medalists for Japan
Asian Games gold medalists in athletics (track and field)
Athletes (track and field) at the 2018 Asian Games
Medalists at the 2018 Asian Games
World Athletics Championships athletes for Japan
Japan Championships in Athletics winners
21st-century Japanese people